Toons for Our Times is the second collection of the comic strip series Bloom County by Berkeley Breathed.  It was published in 1984.

It is preceded by Loose Tails and followed by Penguin Dreams and Stranger Things.

Synopses of major storylines

 Senator Bedfellow is arrested for dealing in black-market "Bill the Cat" tote bags.  Despite Steve Dallas's legal defense, he is found guilty and sent to prison. (p5, 5 strips)
 Binkley's closet of anxieties and the Giant Purple Snorklewacker are introduced.  (p6, 4 strips)
 Opus works the Bloom Beacon's "Personals" desk.  (p11, 5 strips)
 "The Making of an American Stinker."  Steve Dallas's alter ego gives him a tour of his life.  (p16, 6 strips)
 The Meadow Party caucus nominates John Glenn for president and Opus for vice president.  When the Democrats take John Glenn, Limekiller is nominated instead.  (p18, 3 strips)
 The Binkley basement is flooded with toxic waste.  The EPA dispatches a "crisis cleanup team" of Laurel and Hardy lookalikes, who timidly approach the "Sow" chemical company about paying a modest fine for their "lost" waste. (p28, 7 strips)
 Milo dreams that he, Steve Dallas, and Opus are astronauts.  (p40, 4 strips)
 Milo has Opus forge the "secret diaries of Elvis Presley", and anonymously sells them to Newsweek.  (p41, 6 strips)
 Steve Dallas's takes Bobbi Harlow's niece, Yaz Pistachio, to her junior prom.  (p43, 6 strips)
 Binkley dreams he is "Luke Binkleywalker", with "Darth Dallas", "Artoo-Opustoo", Yaz Pistachio as Leia, Milo as Chewbacca, and Cutter John as Han Solo.  The dream concludes with Binkley slaying George Lucas for making him wait fifteen years for a sequel.  (p50, 6 strips)
 As vice presidential candidate for the Meadow Party, Opus campaigns to special-interest groups such as "The Society of Blind Left-Handed Dentists Without Tonsils", "Society of Pro-Acrylic Knitters", and "Americans for Wayne Newton". (p54, 4 strips)
 "The Great Bloom County Snake Massacre."  When a snake is spotted in the swimming hole, a brave group of snake slaughterers successfully hunts down and beats senseless a battery cable from a '73 Pinto.  (p56, 6 strips)
 Milo dreams he is a nationally syndicated cartoonist, chained in a dungeon and whipped by a hairy, hooded torturer. (p58, 4 strips)
 Limekiller moves into Opus's room, where they share a bed.  (p60, 5 strips)
 Oliver Wendell Jones is introduced.  He hacks into the New York Times computer system, and Milo changes the next day's headline from "Reagan Calls Women 'America's Most Valuable Resource'" to "Reagan Calls Women 'America's Little Dumplin's'", resulting in a mass dumpling-pelting attack on the White House by radical feminists but earning Reagan praise from Phyllis Schlafly. (p62, 5 strips)
 Steve Dallas attends his ten-year high school reunion, his face frozen with Novocaine.  (p75, 6 strips)
 Portnoy (not yet named) turns six years old, and experiences a mid-life crisis when he learns that a woodchuck's lifespan is eight.  (p79, 5 strips)
 The Meadow Party hosts a fundraising music festival.  Boy George, Van Halen, and Tess Turbo make appearances.  (p82, 11 strips)
 Oliver Wendell Jones is caught breaking into the IRS computer system, but identifies himself as Steve Dallas.  Steve, thinking that the FBI agents at his door are old frat buddies, blasts them with a fire extinguisher and is sent to prison, where he shares a cell with a group of computer hackers such as "Big Dave Diode".  (p87, 10 strips)
 While campaigning for president, Limekiller emphasizes his campaign committee's diversity by referring to them as "a black, a woman, two dips, and a cripple."  To everyone's dismay, the "radical right" calls to offer their moral support. (p94, 5 strips)

Bloom County
Books by Berkeley Breathed
Little, Brown and Company books
1984 books